The Chinese Laundry building (also called Hop Lee Chong Laundry) is a historic structure at 527 4th Avenue in the Gaslamp Quarter, San Diego, in the U.S. state of California. It was built in 1923.

See also
 List of Gaslamp Quarter historic buildings

References

External links

 

1923 establishments in California
Asian-American culture in San Diego
Buildings and structures in San Diego
Commercial buildings completed in 1923
Gaslamp Quarter, San Diego